Mala Remeta is a village in Serbia. It is situated in the Irig municipality, in the Srem District, Vojvodina province. The village has a Serb ethnic majority and its population numbering 151 people (2002 census).

See also
List of places in Serbia
List of cities, towns and villages in Vojvodina

Populated places in Syrmia